Butler's garter snake (Thamnophis butleri) is a species of garter snake in the family Colubridae. The species is endemic to North America.

Etymology
The specific name butleri is in honor of ornithologist Amos Butler (1860-1937) of Brookville, Indiana.

Geographic range
T. butleri is found in northwestern Ohio, northeastern Indiana, the eastern portion of the Lower Peninsula of Michigan, and the adjacent extreme southern tip of Ontario, Canada. Also, a disjunct population is found in southeastern Wisconsin.

Description and identification
T. butleri is a small, slender snake, averaging  in total length (including tail), with three yellow to orange stripes along the length of its body. The background color can range from olive-brown to black, and it may also be possible to discern two rows of dark spots between the side and back stripes. These features do little to distinguish it from most other garter snakes species, but the placement of the lateral, or side, stripes is unique to this species. In Butler's garter snake the lateral stripes are centered on the third scale row up from the ventral scales, and they also overlap the adjacent second and fourth scale rows. This contrasts with the lateral stripe placement of other garter snake species.

For those hoping to avoid getting close enough to inspect the position of the lateral stripe, other features may help in their identification. The head is unusually small for a garter snake, and, when excited, the effort this snake expends to escape seems to go more towards thrashing in place than to getting away.

Ecology
Butler's garter snake inhabits moist, grassy, open canopy areas, such as meadows, wet prairies, marshes, savannas, and grasslands. Like Kirtland's snake, it may also be found in grassy vacant lots in suburban and residential areas. The species can often be found under rocks, logs, trash, and boards. It subsists on a diet of mainly earthworms, but it may also eat leeches, salamanders, and frogs. The species hibernates communally, often with other garter snake species. Butler's garter snake is a relatively short-lived species, and it reaches sexual maturity in its second spring.

Reproduction
T. butleri is ovoviviparous. Mating takes place in late March and early April. The young are born in June or July, in broods of four to 14.

Conservation status
In Indiana, Butler's garter snake is listed as an endangered species. In Ontario, the species is also listed as endangered.

References

Further reading
Behler, J.L., and F.W. King (1979). The Audubon Society Field Guide to North American Reptiles and Amphibians. New York: Alfred A. Knopf. 743 pp. . (Thamnophis butleri, p. 664 + Plate 529).
Cope, E.D. (1889). On the Eutæniæ of southeastern Indiana. Proc. United States Natl. Mus. 11: 399–401. (Eutænia butleri, new species, p. 399).
Powell, R., R. Conant, and J.T. Collins (2016). Peterson Field Guide to Reptiles and Amphibians of Eastern and Central North America, Fourth Edition. Boston and New York: Houghton Mifflin Harcourt. xiv + 494 pp. . (Thamnophis butleri, pp. 426–427 + Plate 42).
Wright, A.H., and A.A. Wright (1957). Handbook of Snakes of the United States and Canada. Ithaca and London: Comstock Publishing Associates, a Division of Cornell University Press. 1,105 pp. (in 2 volumes). (Thamnophis radix butleri, pp. 816–820, Figure 236 + Map 58 on p. 763).

External links

Center for Reptile and Amphibian Conservation and Management - Indiana-Purdue University
Butler's Garter Snake at Animal Diversity Web
Butler’s Garter Snake, Natural Resources Canada

Thamnophis
Reptiles of Canada
Reptiles of the United States
Taxa named by Edward Drinker Cope